The Manasseh Hill Country Survey is an archaeological survey of the Manasseh Hill Country, a region in Israel and the West Bank associated with the territory of the biblical Israelite tribe of Manasseh. It began in 1978 under the direction of Israeli archaeologist Adam Zertal, and continues for over 40 years. It has been described by fellow archaeologist Israel Finkelstein as “one of the most important ever undertaken in the Land of Israel”.

The survey covered an area of more than 2,500 square kilometers, from the Jordan Valley in the East to the Israeli coastal plain in the West, and from Nahal Iron in the North to the north-eastern point of the Dead Sea in the South. It unearthed over 200 Iron Age I sites covering the area's settlement from 1250 to 1000 BCE. Among the sites discovered during the survey were the Mount Ebal Site (1980) and Ahwat (1992).

The survey's findings were published in seven volumes, originally in 1992 in Hebrew, with an English edition first published in 2000.

Publications 
The Manasseh Hill Country Survey's finding were published in seven volumes. The volumes cover the following areas:
Volume 1: The area of ancient Shechem and Samaria. Author: Adam Zertal
Volume 2: The Eastern Valleys and the Fringes of the Desert. Author: Adam Zertal  
Volume 3: North-western Samaria in Israel/Palestine, from Nahal Iron to Nahal Shechem. Authors: Adam Zertal and Nivi Mirkam
Volume 4: The north-eastern region of Samaria, mainly the northern area of the Jordan Valley from Nahal Bezeq to the Sartaba Authors: Adam Zertal and Shay Bar 
Volume 5: The eastern region of Samaria, mainly the Middle Jordan Valley, from Wadi Fasael to Wadi Auja, within the territory of Israel/Palestine. Authors: Shay Bar and Adam Zertal 
Volume 6: The Eastern Samaria Shoulder, from Nahal Tirzah (Wadi Far'ah) to Ma'ale Efrayim Junction within the territory of Israel/Palestine. Authors: Shay Bar and Adam Zertal 
Volume 7: The South-Eastern Samaria Shoulder, from Wadi Rashash to Wadi Auja within the territory of Israel/Palestine. Authors: Shay Bar and Adam Zertal

References

Archaeology of Israel
Archaeological expeditions